Tourism in Mumbai (Bombay) is an industry that attracts almost 6 million tourists per year, making it the 30th-most visited location worldwide. According to United Nations, as of 2018, Mumbai was the second most populous city in India after Delhi and the seventh most populous city in the world with a population of 19.98 million.

Mumbai offers natural heritage and modern entertainment including leisure spots, beaches, cinemas, studios, holy places, amusement parks and historical monuments. 
Museums in the city are:
Daji bhau lad museum,
Shivaji Maharaj Vastu Sanhrahalaya,
Nehru Science Museum, 
National museum of Modern art, 
National museum of Indian Cinema, 
Mani Bhavan Gandhi Sanhrahalaya.
Transport options include air, road, train and ship.

Economic impact
The World Travel & Tourism Council calculated that tourism generated US$3.9 billion or 3.2% of the city's GDP in 2016 and supported 637,900 jobs, 7.3% of its total employment. The sector is predicted to grow at an average annual rate of 8.8% to US$9 billion by 2026 (3.1% of GDP). Mumbai's tourism industry accounted for 5.4% of India's total travel and tourism-related GDP in 2016, and employed 2.4% of the country's total workforce.

Foreign tourists accounted for 35.7% of all tourism-related spending in Mumbai in 2016. Nearly one-fifth of foreign tourists visiting the city come from the United Arab Emirates.

Climate  

Mumbai has a tropical climate. It has 3 seasons : summer, winter and monsoon. Summers are usually hot, winters are cool and monsoon period brings a lot of rains to the city. The average minimum temperature varies between 15 C and  27 C. The average maximum temperature varies between 29 C and 34 C. The best period to visit Mumbai is from October to February.

Water activities

Many beaches in Mumbai are open to the general public. Beach locations include:

 Juhu Beach
 Kalamb Beach
 Marvé Beach

Additionally, lakeside destinations in Mumbai include:
 Powai Lake
 Tulsi Lake
 Vihar Lake
 Bandra Talao

Parks and recreation

Recreational destinations in Mumbai include:
 EsselWorld
 Adlabs Imagica
 Sanjay Gandhi National Park
 Wet n`Joy

Forts and caves

Mumbai’s most significant historical locations include more than 14 forts and 5 naturally-formed caves. A few examples include:

 Elephanta Caves
 Kanheri Caves
 Mahim Fort
 Belapur Fort
 Bombay Castle
 Castella de Aguada

Film City
One of the major attraction in Mumbai is the Film City in Goregaon. It was built by Dada Saheb Phalke & V. Shantaram. The Film City was built in 20th Century & is situated near Goregaon & Borivali National Park. The entry to the Goregaon Film City is free of cost and is open from 10 am to 11:30 pm.
The Hindi film industry, often monotonously referred to as Bollywood, is based in Mumbai. It offers major cinemas and is home to more than 20 film studios.

Other attractions

Religious destinations 
Mumbai has number of beautiful temples, mosques & churches. The list of religious places in Mumbai includes Siddhivinayak Temple, Mahalaxmi Temple, Haji Ali Dargah, Global Vipassana Pagoda, St Thomas Cathedral, Iskcon Temple, the Mount Bandra Church and many more.

Miscellaneous 
 Gurudwara Khalsa Sabha (Matunga)
 Knesset Eliyahoo 
 Nariman House
 Kitab Khana - bookstore

Other important historical sites 
 Gateway of India 
 Bandra-Worli Sea Link

References